Vehicle regulations are requirements that automobiles must satisfy in order to be approved for sale or use in a particular country or region. They are usually mandated by legislation, and administered by a government body. The regulations concern aspects such as lighting, controls, crashworthiness, environment protection and theft protection, and might include safety belts or automated features.

History

Some countries have had national regulations for a long time. The first steps toward harmonizing vehicle regulations internationally were made in 1952 when WP.29, a working party of experts on vehicles' technical requirements, was created. This resulted in the 1958 Agreement on uniform conditions of approval and mutual recognition of vehicle approvals, components, and parts. This was one of the first international agreements on vehicle regulation, which initially focused on European countries. The European Union played a role in harmonizing regulations between member states. Later, the 1958 agreement was opened to non-European countries such as Japan, Korea, and Australia.

To join the WP.29, one has to send a letter signed by an important official from their country or regional economic integration organization (REIO) informing the secretariat of WP.29 that they would like to participate in meetings regarding the harmonization of vehicle regulations (United Nations). The next step to participate would be to get the registration form completed by delegates who are also attending the meeting. Other parties such as Non-Governmental Organizations (NGOs) must be of certified advisory status to the Economic and Social Council of the United Nations (ECOSOC).

There was a new international agreement in 1998 whose objectives were to improve global safety, decrease environmental pollution and consumption of energy and improve anti‐theft performance of vehicles and related components and equipment through establishing global technical regulations (GTRs) in a Global Registry based on UNECE Regulations or national regulations listed in a Compendium of candidates, GTR harmonizing them at the highest level. In 2000, WP.29 became the World Forum for Harmonization of Vehicle Regulations that is a working party of the United Nations Economic Commission for Europe (UNECE).

In 1947 the United Nations Economic  Commission for  Europe  (UNECE) was established to reconstruct Europe after the war took place, expand profitable activity, and nourish relationships between European countries and the rest of the nation. With the help of UNECE, it is used as policy dialogue, economic dialogue, and assist countries in their intermingling into the global economy. UNECE attempts to maintain amicable relationships amongst other countries involving transport, trade, statistics, energy, forestry, housing, and land management (UN. ECE). UNECE is multisector that is a tool used to tackle hardships that may arise providing solutions when possible.

Geographical regulations
International
United Nations has a World Forum for Harmonization of Vehicle Regulations related to three vehicle agreements.
 1998 agreement, global agreement including 38 countries: (Global Technical Regulations). In the parties are Japan, Australia, Korea, Russia, European Union, United Kingdom, Canada, China, South Africa and the US.
 1958 agreement, regional agreement including 58 parties: ECE (United Nations Economic Commission for Europe). In the parties are Japan, Australia,  Korea, Russia and the European Union and United Kingdom.
 Regional agreements and regulations
 European Union is a single market with the European Economic Area with laws named EU directive or regulation EU regulations which make some UNECE regulations applicable at a given date in its 27 member states.
 NAFTA makes Canada, the US and Mexico to share some safety regulations.
National
United States: FMVSS (administered by the U.S. National Highway Traffic Safety Administration (NHTSA), which also administers the Corporate Average Fuel Economy (CAFE) standard)
Canada: CMVSS
China: Guobiao standards
South Korea: KMVSS
Australia: ADR (Australian Design Rules) Australia applies some UNECE regulation such as regulation 16 and some FMVS 209 regulation.
Japan: Test Requirements and Instructions for Automobile Standards. As a member of both the 1958 and the 1998 agreement Japan applies 64 regulations from those two set of regulations.
India: AIS (Automotive Industry Standards), BSES (Bharat stage emission standards)
United Kingdom: inherited EU laws and might comply with some UNECE regulations
Provincial/State
 California state, United States: CARB (California Air Resources Board)

Table of regulations

Global regulations and their relation with national / regional law

Specific national / regional regulations

Other shared regulations

UNECE regulations

Japan applies and is a member of the following UNECE regulations
 3, approval of retro-reflecting devices for power-driven vehicles and their trailers
 4, illumination of rear registration plates of power-driven vehicles and their trailers
 6, approval of direction indicators for power-driven vehicles and their trailers
 7, front and rear position lamps, stop-lamps and end-outline marker lamps for motor vehicles and their trailers
 10, electromagnetic compatibility
 11, door latches and door retention components
 12, protection of the driver against the steering mechanism in the event of impact
 13, braking
 14, safety-belt anchorages
 16, various safety belt related considerations
 17, seats, their anchorages and any head restraints
 19, front fog lamps
 21, interior fittings
 23, reversing and manoeuvring lamps for power-driven vehicles and their trailers
 25, head restraints (headrests), whether or not incorporated in vehicle seats
 26, external projections
 27, advance-warning triangles
 28, audible warning devices and of motor vehicles with regard to their audible warning signals
 30, pneumatic tyres for motor vehicles and their trailers
 34, prevention of fire risks
 37, filament light sources for use in approved lamps of power-driven vehicles and of their trailers
 38, rear fog lamps for power-driven vehicles and their trailers
 39, speedometer and odometer equipment including its installation
 41, motor cycles with regard to noise
 43, safety glazing materials and their installation on vehicles
 44, Child Restraint Systems
 45, headlamp cleaners, and of power-driven vehicles with regard to headlamp cleaners
 46, devices for indirect vision and of motor vehicles with regard to the installation of these devices
 48, installation of lighting and light-signalling devices
 50, front position lamps, rear position lamps, stop lamps, direction indicators and rear-registration-plate illuminating devices for vehicles of category L
 51, motor vehicles having at least four wheels with regard to their sound emissions
 54, pneumatic tyres for commercial vehicles and their trailers
 58, Rear underrun ...
 60, two-wheeled motor cycles and mopeds with regard to driver-operated controls including the identification of controls, tell-tales and indicators
 62, power-driven vehicles with handlebars with regard to their protection against unauthorized use
 64, vehicles with regard to their equipment which may include: a temporary use spare unit, run flat tyres and/or a run flat system and/or extended mobility tyres
 66, large passenger vehicles with regard to the strength of their superstructure
 70, rear marking plates for heavy and long vehicles
 75, pneumatic tyres for L-category vehicles
 77, parking lamps for power-driven vehicles
 78, vehicles of categories L1, L2, L3, L4 and L5 with regard to braking
 79, steering equipment
 80, seats of large passenger vehicles and of these vehicles with regard to the strength of the seats and their anchorages
 81, rear-view mirrors of two-wheeled power-driven vehicles
 85, internal combustion engines or electric drive trains intended for the propulsion of motor vehicles of categories M and N with regard to the measurement of the net power and the maximum 30 minutes power of electric drive trains

OECD regulations
European union follows OECD regulations for tractors, for instance:
 code 6: structures de protection montées à l'avant des tracteurs agricoles et forestiers [à voie étroite,
 code 7: structures de protection montées à l'arrière des tracteurs agricoles et forestiers à voie étroite.

Bilateral agreements

Some trade agreements such as the EU-South Korea Free Trade Agreement may contain reference to a matching mapping of local requirements, for instance such mappings exists in appendix 2-C of the EU-South Korea Free Trade Agreement.

Example of differences

See also
 FMVSS

References

External links 
Synoptic about International Regulations
 
 ECE, UN. “World Forum For Harmonization of Vehicle Regulations (WP.29).” World Forum for Harmonization of Vehicle Regulations (WP.29): How It Works, How to Join It, Economic Commission for Europe (ECE), 2019, digitallibrary.un.org/record/3824138?ln=en.
 Nations, United. “GENERAL QUESTIONS RELATED TO WP.29 AND ITS SUBSIDIARY BODIES.” UNECE, ECOSOC, Feb. 2019, www.unece.org/trans/main/wp29/faq.

Automotive standards
Regulation
Vehicle law
Regulation of technologies